Azer may refer to:
Azer (name)
Azer (Dungeons & Dragons), a race from a plane of fire in Dungeons & Dragons
AZER, the reporting mark for the Arizona Eastern Railway, a Class III railroad in the southwestern United States

See also 
Azerbaijan (disambiguation)
Azerbaijani (disambiguation)